Daxing Xincheng station is a station on the Daxing Airport Express of the Beijing Subway. It was opened on September 26, 2019.

Station Layout 
The station has an underground island platform.

Exits 
There are 3 exits, lettered A, B, and C. Exits A and C are accessible.

References 

Beijing Subway stations in Daxing District